Robert Huang may refer to:
 Robert T. Huang, founder of SYNNEX Corporation
 Blaber (gamer), professional League of Legends player
 Huang Teng-hui, Taiwanese artist and entrepreneur